Batar was the name of a railway station on the North Coast railway line on the North Coast of New South Wales, Australia. The station, named for the nearby Batar Creek, existed at the site between 1941 and 1971.

References 

 

Disused regional railway stations in New South Wales
Mid North Coast
Railway stations in Australia opened in 1941
Railway stations closed in 1971